Damion Ian Kenton Barry (born 3 March 1982 in Chaguanas) is a sprinter from Trinidad and Tobago who specializes in the 400 metres.

His personal best time is 45.55 seconds, achieved in June 2005 in Port-of-Spain.

He attended the Kansas City Kansas Community College and Auburn University in the United States.

Competition record

References

External links
 
 Best of Trinidad
 Auburn Tigers' player bio

1982 births
Living people
Auburn Tigers men's track and field athletes
Trinidad and Tobago male sprinters
Athletes (track and field) at the 2000 Summer Olympics
Athletes (track and field) at the 2004 Summer Olympics
Olympic athletes of Trinidad and Tobago
Athletes (track and field) at the 2006 Commonwealth Games
Athletes (track and field) at the 2003 Pan American Games
Central American and Caribbean Games silver medalists for Trinidad and Tobago
Competitors at the 2006 Central American and Caribbean Games
Central American and Caribbean Games medalists in athletics
Commonwealth Games competitors for Trinidad and Tobago
Pan American Games competitors for Trinidad and Tobago